Paul David Bogle has been Dean of Clonmacnoise since 2014.

Bogle was born in 1957 and educated at the  Church of Ireland Theological Institute. He was ordained in 2011. After a curacy in Dunboyne he has been the incumbent at Trim from 2013.

References

1957 births
Living people
Alumni of the Church of Ireland Theological Institute
Deans of Clonmacnoise